Mullana is a town, near city of Ambala in Ambala district in the state of Haryana, India, located on the border with the state of Punjab and in proximity of the state capital Chandigarh.

It is also an assembly constituency and the location of Maharishi Markandeshwar University, Mullana.

See also

References

External links 
 

Cities and towns in Ambala district
Ambala district
Haryana